Thanks a Lot is an album by American country singer Ernest Tubb, released in 1964 (see 1964 in music).

Track listing
"Thanks a Lot" (Eddie Miller, Don Sessions)
"Way That You're Living" (Jimmy Swan)
"Green Light" (Hank Thompson)  
"Your Side of the Story" (Justin Tubb) 
"There She Goes" (Eddie Miller, W. S. Stevenson, Durwood Haddock)
"That's All She Wrote" (Jerry Fuller)
"Steppin' Out" (Billy Starr)
"Stop Me If You've Heard This One Before" (J. Tubb)
"I Almost Lost My Mind" (Ivory Joe Hunter) 
"Big Fool of the Year" (J. Tubb)
"Take a Letter Miss Gray" (J. Tubb)
"Lonesome 7-7203" (J. Tubb)

Personnel
Ernest Tubb – vocals, guitar
Cal Smith – guitar
Leon Rhodes – guitar
Grady Martin – guitar
Buddy Charleton – pedal steel guitar
Harold Bradley – bass
Jack Drake – bass
Jack Greene – drums
Harold Weakley – drums
Hargus "Pig" Robbins – piano
Floyd Cramer – piano
The Jordanaires – vocals

Chart positions

References

Ernest Tubb albums
1964 albums
Albums produced by Owen Bradley
Decca Records albums